Lee Hyo-ri (born May 10, 1979) is a South Korean singer, record producer, activist, actress and television presenter. Dubbed as the "Nation's Fairy" during her Family Outing days, she debuted as a member of South Korean girl group Fin.K.L, but has since become a solo artist. In 2003, she released her debut solo album Stylish which won several "Artist of the Year" awards. In 2006, Lee was the highest-paid female singer in South Korea when she signed a contract with Mnet Media.

Biography

1979–1997: Early life 
Lee was born in 1979 in Osong-ri, Cheongwon County, North Chungcheong Province, South Korea, as the youngest of three daughters. Lee grew up impoverished, in a barbershop of about 8 pyeong (approximately 285 square feet). After being expelled from middle school once, Lee worked part-time at a restaurant and was scouted by an agency and cast by the manager of H.O.T. (band). She prepared for a girl group debut while living as a trainee of SM Entertainment before eventually debuting as the leader of Fin.K.L.

1998–2002: Career beginnings in Fin.K.L

Lee began her career as part of South Korean pop girl group Fin.K.L. As the eldest member, she was the leader of the group. Lee was discovered while taking sticker pictures with her friends and was the last member to join Fin.K.L, just before their debut in January 1998. Fin.K.L debuted officially on May 22, 1998, with their first single "Blue Rain". The second release from their debut album, To My Boyfriend, became the first of their multiple number one hits. Fin.K.L became one of the most popular and successful South Korean pop groups of all-time, rivaling fellow popular girl group S.E.S.

2003–2005: Stylish

A year after Fin.K.L's fourth studio album Forever, her solo debut album was released in August 2003, entitled Stylish. The lead single "10 Minutes" became one of her signature hits and the singer nearly swept the Daesangs, the most prestigious South Korean music award, winning more than seven of them, including three of the four most prestigious Daesangs. Stylish sold 144,182 copies in South Korea alone, according to the Music Industry Association of Korea in 2003. Her popularity in her various activities eventually was dubbed as the "Hyori Syndrome" in South Korea, and the Korean Media nicknamed 2003 "The Year of Hyori" as she was rarely out of the news all year.

In January 2005, Lee made her acting debut in the SBS TV series Three Leaf Clover, starring opposite Ryu Jin, Kim Jung-hwa, Kim Kang-woo, and Lee Hoon. However, the 16-episode drama received low ratings (less than 10%) and Lee was criticized for her acting, with viewers saying she was miscast as a downtrodden but cheerful steel mill worker.

On August 8, 2005, she co-hosted the annual Korean Music Festival for the second year running.

2006–2007: Signing with Mnet and Dark Angel

In February 2006, Lee released her follow-up album, Dark Angel. The first single, "Get Ya!", was accused of being plagiarized by the songwriters of Britney Spears' single "Do Somethin'".

Despite the failure of her previous drama Three Leaf Clover, in 2007, Lee starred opposite Lee Dong-gun in the mini-drama If in Love... Like Them. Although originally announced as being only one episode long, it aired for four episodes on Mnet. An edited two-episode version of the drama also ran on SBS. During filming, part of a roof Lee was standing on collapsed. Only her foot fell through, but reportedly the fall might have been fatal if co-star Lee Dong-gun had not rescued her.

In February 2007, Lee announced her new digital single which would essentially be the soundtrack to If in Love... Like Them. She performed all three main tracks from the single on Inkigayo on February 25, 2007. The lead song was "Toc Toc Toc". Despite the single's genre being R&B, Lee began to sing more ballads afterwards, slowly moving away from her "sexy superstar" image. The single, although initially given a digital-only release, was given a limited retail release of only 30,000 copies. It was released on March 6, 2007, and in addition to the three tracks found in the digital single, it included a reworked version of "Toc Toc Toc." It was the best-selling album for that month, selling 27,845 copies.

Although her single was commercially successful, her drama was heavily penalized for violating advertising guidelines, as If in Love... Like Them had several instances of overt product placement, in addition to using Lee's songs in the soundtrack. The Korean Broadcasting Committee ruled that the drama should not be aired in South Korea again, and that the network must apologize to its viewers.

Lee also did promotions in Japan when Japanese network Fuji TV aired If in Love... Like Them, where Lee was given the same VIP treatment offered to other international stars. The drama was broadcast on CS Fuji, a smaller satellite channel that Fuji TV owned.

2008–2009: TV hosting and It's Hyorish
During breaks in her solo music career, Lee also hosted various television programs, including Time Machine and Happy Together, which she co-hosted with Yoo Jae-suk in 2006. On April 8, 2008, she joined KBS's Sang Sang Plus as a co-host alongside Country Kkokko members Shin Jung-hwan and Tak Jae-hoon. She was one of the original co-hosts of Change, a show on SBS's Good Sunday line-up, before leaving in early July. She is also a former cast member of the variety show Family Outing, appearing in only the first season. Mnet ran a 12-episode show called Off the Record: Lee Hyori, which documented Lee's life on-set for three months; the show's purpose was to lessen the gap between the singer and her fans/anti-fans by letting them see that she is just another human being like everyone.

On December 20, 2008, Lee held her first solo concert Lee Hyori the Invincible at the Jamsil Arena. Upon release, tickets to the concert sold out in five minutes.

Her third studio album, It's Hyorish, was released on July 14, 2008. "U-Go-Girl", the first single from the album, peaked at number 1 on online and offline charts, including various television music shows.

In November 2009, her contract with Mnet Media was set to expire. Lee planned to sign a contract with Gil Entertainment (currently B2M Entertainment) and work with Gil Jong-hwa, Fin.K.L's co-manager who had worked with the group since its debut. However, her 2010 album was released under the label of Mnet Media.

2010–2015: H-Logic, Album plagiarism controversy and Monochrome

Almost two years after her previous album, Lee returned with H-Logic on April 12, 2010. The album has 14 tracks, including collaborations with Daesung from Big Bang, Jeon Ji-yoon from 4Minute, Bekah from After School, Gary from Leessang, and Sangchu from Mighty Mouth. The singer worked also with E-Tribe, the team behind "U-Go-Girl", the lead single from her previous album.

A music video was released for "Swing", featuring Gary from Leessang, on March 31, 2010.  The lead single "Chitty Chitty Bang Bang" and its music video were released soon after. The self-penned song, which features Ceejay (from Freshboyz), was released the same day as her album. She won two Mutizen Song awards on The Music Trend for her lead single within two weeks.

Soon after the release of the album H-Logic, seven of its songs, composed by Bahnus, were accused of plagiarism (among the allegedly plagiarized songs was "Bring It Back," performed by Canadian girl group Cookie Couture). On June 21, 2010, Lee admitted that the plagiarism accusations against her album were true, saying she had been "deceived"; she temporarily stopped all her activities as a singer and suspended her TV appearances.

While on hiatus, Lee began to grow as a cultural influence. She wrote online columns for vernacular newspapers such as The Hankyoreh that mixed her thoughts on life and career with social commentary, and was well reviewed for her simple prose, humor and intelligence. She also became an increasing presence in the civic community, emerging as one of the country's most high-profile animals rights activists. In 2011, Lee released two charity songs for donation to animal shelters, "Please Stay Behind" and "Remember".

Beginning March 4, 2012, she and singer-songwriter/pianist Jung Jae-hyung hosted the music show Jung Jae-hyung & Lee Hyo-ri's You and I on SBS. The show aired its final episode on October 14, 2012, ending its ten-month run due to low ratings.

After her comeback was pushed back several times throughout 2012, it was announced that Lee would return to the stage with her fifth full-length album in May 2013. Five video teasers were released on YouTube on April 23, 2013. On May 6, 2013, she released her pre-release track for the album, titled "Miss Korea". Lee herself wrote and composed the sophisticated retro-jazz song (it was arranged by her then-boyfriend, guitarist Lee Sang-soon), and the full-version music video released on the same day was a black-and-white video depicting Lee as a circa 1950s-type glamorous Miss Korea pageant crown holder. She personally selected 30 non-celebrity women "with love and respect for themselves" who she saw as the genuine Miss Korea's to perform the song with her on stage at the 2013 SBS Gayo Daejeon televised concert.

Her fifth studio album, Monochrome, was released on May 21, 2013. Lee wrote the lyrics for eight of the 16 tracks on the album, and reportedly used a full band instead of using electronically generated sounds for the songs. Upon its release, eight tracks were ranked in the top 10 on Bugs, Olleh and Naver Music, while its lead track, "Bad Girls" topped the charts on Melon, Naver, Olleh and Bugs. She performed "Bad Girls" as part of a highly praised collaboration stage at the 2013 SBS Gayo Daejeon televised concert along with CL from girl group 2NE1, who had also released a bad girl themed song that year called The Baddest Female.

On April 2, 2014, SBS announced she and actress Moon So-ri would host a talk show Magic Eye. The show started filming in April. Due to low ratings, the show aired its final episode on November 18, 2014.

2015–2017: Black
In February 2015, Lee's representatives announced that her contract with B2M Entertainment had expired in 2013. In May 2015, Lee announced that she closed her blog as well as her Twitter account. Along with shutting down her social media, she stopped all of her television activities. In October of that year, Lee's representative told media outlets that she would be taking a 2-year hiatus from her entertainment career, "in order to have time for herself."

In October 2016, Lee hinted at working on new music. In November, it was confirmed that Lee had signed with Kiwi Media Group with a new album due in 2017. In December, Lee made a return to social media with posts on Instagram.

In January 2017, Kwi Media's CEO Kim Hyung Suk revealed on MBC's Video Star that Lee was taking on the bulk of the responsibility for her new album as executive producer while working with him and "10 Minutes" songwriter Kim Dong Hyun.

In April 2017, it was announced that Lee would be starring with her husband in a new variety show entitled Hyori's Homestay. In June, Lee's agency confirmed her comeback for early July as she prepared to film a music video for the single. Later the same month, her agency announced that singer-songwriter Lee Juck would be featured on one of the tracks.

A few days later, Lee released a teaser image and video teaser for the album's pre-release track "Seoul". The self-composed electro-R&B song was released on June 28, 2017, alongside the music video featuring the contrasting visuals of Seoul and Jeju Island. The album's tracklist was revealed along with a series of visual teasers for the album a few days before the album's release.

On July 4, 2017, her sixth studio album, Black, was released alongside the rustic-themed official music video for the title track. The mature, experimental sound started with Monochrome continues as Lee wrote eight and composed nine of the ten album tracks.

2017–present: Reality show, SSAK3 and Refund Sisters
Lee and her husband, Lee Sang-soon, turned their house in Jeju Island into a guest house to film Hyori's Homestay. In season 1, IU joins the show as an employee. In season 2, the employee position was replaced by YoonA, also in this season Park Bo-gum came to work as a temporary employee.

In 2019, Lee reunited with Fin.K.L in a new reality show “Camping Club”.

On May 15, 2020, Lee announced that she had signed a contract with ESteem Entertainment. Through MBC's Hangout with Yoo, she, under the stage name Linda G, founded the summer project co-ed trio named SSAK3 with Rain and Yoo Jae-suk. They released a debut single "Beach Again" on July 18, 2020 and officially debuted on July 25 with a debut stage on Music Core. SSAK3 is a special summer project, and they announced that all proceeds from their songs and promotions will be donated to communities in need.

After SSAK3 project, Hangout with Yoo programme has a spin-off from Lee naming Uhm Jung-hwa, Jessi and Hwasa as the members she wanted in her dream girl group during the SSAK3 segment. The four women formed another girl group named Refund Sisters (환불원정대) with Yoo Jae-suk as a producer. They released a debut single "Don't Touch Me" on October 10, 2020.

On October 13, 2021, it was announced that Lee will be hosting the 2021 Mnet Asian Music Awards on December 11, 2021, making her the first woman to host the show solo.

In February 2023, Lee signed with Antenna.

Artistry and image 
After the disbandment of Fin.K.L., Lee's style has been categorized as Urban Pop and dance-pop. With the release of H-Logic, Lee began to experiment with her sound by incorporating hip-hop into her music. Later releases have been influenced by country, blues, disco, folk and rock music. At the beginning of her solo career, Lee would sometimes write or co-write material for her albums alongside other songwriters. Later in her career, she began self-composing and producing much of her own material. Thematically, Lee's songs have ranged from love and heartbreak to empowerment to social commentary with a female perspective.

Lee's vocal range can be classified in the mezzo-soprano range. In spite of her sexy image, she has been recognized for her emotional delivery in songs like "Swing" and "Amor Mio". Lee has been criticized for her vocal ability, which she responded with "I think everyone thinks differently, so they can think so. Before, I felt like I was hiding behind the instruments. It felt uncomfortable otherwise. But starting from a point, I started liking my voice. Since I like it, it didn't really matter what other people thought."

Lee has been influenced by fellow Korean singer Uhm Jung-hwa.

Image 
As a member of Fin K.L, Lee became known for her sex appeal. This image has allowed Lee to lend her face and image to advertising for various company endorsement deals, and in 2005 she was chosen in a consumer survey as the female entertainer with the strongest brand power. In late 2003, Lee signed an advertising contract with Samsung, for which she would make three musical commercials and songs for their Anycall cell phones, which became some of her most prominent commercials. The first commercial and song, "Anymotion", was released in early 2005, featuring Eric Mun from Shinhwa. In early 2006, the follow-up commercial "Anyclub" featuring Teddy Park from 1TYM was released in two parts; the music video starred Eric Mun and actor Kwon Sang-woo. The songs from the commercials served as singles for Lee in between her albums. The final commercial was released in December 2006, titled "Anystar" and differed from the first two in that it featured mostly dialogue. The commercial starred actor Lee Joon-gi and YG Family trainee Park Bom (2NE1). Her contract with Samsung ended in December 2007.

For five years, Lee was the model for Lotte Liquor, making her its longest-serving endorser. According to Lotte, the market share of the company's soju brand rose from 11 to 15 percent while Lee modeled for it. Her contract ended in November 2012.

In 2007, she starred in a commercial with Jessica Alba for South Korean cosmetics company Ĭsa Knox, which was shot in Vancouver, British Columbia, Canada. Lee also modeled for cosmetics company Biotherm (her contract ended in February 2007), and Black Bean Therapy, a health drink. She then signed with KB Card, and has starred in commercials along with Rain. She was a model for Calvin Klein Jeans, modeling for the "Pure Calvin" Collection. She was also briefly featured in a 2010 Adidas commercial. Over the years, Lee has appeared in music videos for artists like Davichi and Leessang.

Stage name controversy 
During an episode of Hangout with Yoo, Lee Hyori was brainstorming stage names for the project group Refund Sisters. During this conversation she said, “How about a Chinese name, since we could go global? How about ‘Mao’?” In response to this, Chinese viewers of the show expressed their discontent as the name was reminiscent of Mao Zedong.

Impact 
Lee Hyori has appeared on the Korea Power Celebrity 40 multiple times throughout her career, including placing within the top 15 in 2009–2011. Lee has been citied as an inspiration or influence by numerous artists, including Kara, Jeon Somi, Chungha, Jessica Jung, Dalshabet, Nada, Cherry Bullet's Jiwon, Oh My Girl's Jiho, Laboum's Solbin, Elris's Sohee, Jung Eun-chae, Jin Se-yeon, and Huh Chan-mi.

Other activities

Activism 
Lee has been recognized as one of South Korea's leading socialtainers for her charity work and raising her voice for social causes. She adheres to a pescetarian diet according to her personal ethics and health beliefs and is an advocate for animal welfare and animal rights. In 2012 she published Closer, a photo-essay book that focuses on her everyday life with her dog Soonshim whom Lee adopted from an animal shelter. In the book Lee wrote her thoughts on animal rights and animal shelters as well as her sentiments toward wearing animal fur. She has given money to shelters along with taking in stray and abused animals. Her work in animal activism has led her to interviewing Jane Goodall.

When SsangYong Motor laid off workers in December 2014, Lee gave public support of the workers via Twitter, announcing that she wanted to see the new car Tivoli sell well so they would be hired again, adding that, if it happened, she would dance in front of the car in a bikini.

During the 2012 presidential elections, Lee encouraged her fans to vote through a series of tweets and re-tweets. This drew both admiration and annoyance from others on social media.

In a June 2012 poll by Panelnow, Lee was listed as one of "the socialtainers that best represents Korea" alongside broadcaster Kim Je-dong, singer Kim Jang-hoon, and actress Kim Yeo-jin.

Personal life
She married musician Lee Sang-soon, guitarist of rock band Roller Coaster, on September 1, 2013, at their vacation home on Mt. Halla in Jeju Island. Both of them are members of an animal rights group and began dating after they collaborated in July 2011 on a song that Lee recorded to support animal shelters. In 2021, South China Morning Post estimated her net worth to be around US$30–40 million.

Discography

 Stylish...E (2003)
 Dark Angel (2006)
 It's Hyorish (2008)
 H-Logic (2010)
 Monochrome (2013)
 Black (2017)

Concerts and tours
 The First Concert: Lee Hyori the Invincible (2008)

Filmography

Television

Web shows

Film

Hosting

Video games

Bibliography

Awards and nominations

References

External links

 
 Hyolee World
 Lee Hyori discography at MusicTea
 
 

1979 births
English-language singers from South Korea
Fin.K.L members
Grand Prize Seoul Music Award recipients
Kookmin University alumni
Living people
Animal rights activists
Progressivism in South Korea
South Korean progressives
Singers from Seoul
South Korean activists
South Korean women activists
South Korean environmentalists
South Korean women environmentalists
South Korean dance musicians
South Korean female idols
South Korean female models
South Korean women pop singers
South Korean record producers
South Korean television presenters
South Korean women television presenters
MAMA Award winners
20th-century South Korean women singers
21st-century South Korean singers
21st-century South Korean women singers
South Korean women record producers
South Korean mezzo-sopranos
SSAK3 members